Zion Lutheran Church, also known as Organ Church, is a historic Lutheran church located near Rockwell, Rowan County, North Carolina.  It was built in 1794, and is a two-story, stone building.  A large bell tower was added about 1900; it is topped by a heavy octagonal spire with a weathervane.  A Sunday School addition was built on the rear of the church in 1929.

An earlier wooden structure commonly known as the "Hickory Church" (circa mid-1750s) was shared with Grace Church  on the plantation of Jacob Fulenwiler, the current site of St. Peter's Lutheran Church. When Fulenwiler died in 1771, both churches moved to Grace Church's current location, with Organ Church moving to its own site in 1774.

Organ Church was added to the National Register of Historic Places in 1972.

References

Lutheran churches in North Carolina
Churches completed in 1794
18th-century Lutheran churches in the United States
Churches in Rowan County, North Carolina
Churches on the National Register of Historic Places in North Carolina
National Register of Historic Places in Rowan County, North Carolina
1794 establishments in the United States